Live Phish Vol. 1 was recorded live at the Broome County Veterans Memorial Arena in Binghamton, New York on December 14, 1995. The show occurred towards the end of the band's 1995 fall tour, which featured a tour-long chess game between Phish and its audience. The second disc begins with a fan making a chess move onstage on behalf of the audience.

The show contains a rare (for 1995) extended jam out of "Halley's Comet", as well as the final appearance of "Keyboard Army" -- a collaborative piece that debuted earlier the same year and features all four band members on keyboards -- until 2015.

The release reached a peak position of #97 on the Billboard 200 album chart. The album marked the first time that longtime Phish concert staples "Suzy Greenberg", "Makisupa Policeman", "Tela", "The Curtain" and "Halley's Comet" had appeared on an official Phish release. The version of "Taste" that appears on the release is referred to by fans as "Taste That Surrounds", and is an alternate version of the song with different lyrics that was only performed on the fall 1995 tour.

Track listing

Disc one
Set one:
"Suzy Greenberg" → (Anastasio, Pollak) - 7:22
"Llama" (Anastasio) - 5:52
"Horn" → (Anastasio, Marshall) - 3:29
"Foam" (Anastasio) - 10:53
"Makisupa Policeman" → (Anastasio, Marshall) - 6:43
"Split Open and Melt" (Anastasio) - 14:41
"Tela" (Anastasio) - 6:30
"Taste" (Anastasio, Fishman, Gordon, Marshall, McConnell) - 8:00*
"My Sweet One" (Fishman) - 2:23
"Frankenstein" (Winter) - 5:02

Disc two
Set two:
"The Curtain" → (Anastasio, Daubert) - 7:18
"Tweezer" → (Anastasio, Fishman, Gordon, McConnell) - 9:16
"Timber" → (White) - 4:57
"Tweezer" → (Anastasio, Fishman, Gordon, McConnell) - 9:47
"Keyboard Army" (Anastasio, Fishman, Gordon, McConnell) - 3:48
"Halley's Comet" → (Wright) - 11:53
"NICU" → (Anastasio, Marshall) - 9:10
"Slave to the Traffic Light" (Abrahams, Anastasio, Pollak) - 11:25
Encore:
"Bold as Love" (Hendrix) - 6:16
*Actually a variation on "Taste" called "Taste That Surrounds", which has different lyrics and structure.

Personnel
Trey Anastasio - guitars, lead vocals, keyboards on "Keyboard Army"
Page McConnell - piano, organ, backing vocals, lead vocals on "Tela" and "Bold as Love"
Mike Gordon - bass, backing vocals, keyboards on "Keyboard Army"
Jon Fishman - drums, vacuum, vocals, co-lead vocals on "Taste", keyboards on "Keyboard Army"

Setlist from Phish.net
Phish.net hosts a detailed setlist archive maintained by fans.

Thursday, 12/14/1995 Broome County Arena, Binghamton, NY

SET 1: Suzy Greenberg > Llama, Horn > Foam, Makisupa Policeman > Split Open and Melt, Tela, Taste That Surrounds, My Sweet One, Frankenstein

SET 2: The Curtain > Tweezer -> Timber (Jerry the Mule) -> Tweezer -> Keyboard Army, Halley's Comet -> NICU -> Slave to the Traffic Light

ENCORE: Bold As Love

Notes: The jam into Timber included a Slipknot! tease. Bold As Love was played for a fan up front with a sign requesting it. A humorous scene ensued when another fan got excited, as if Trey was referring to his Brother sign. Trey remarked that when fans bring signs, it has to be for a song the band wants to play.

See also
 Phish.net Song History: "Keyboard Army"
 Phish.net Song History: "Halley's Comet"

References

01
2001 live albums